Rodolfo Flores may refer to:
 Rodolfo Flores (sport shooter), Mexican sport shooter
 Rodolfo P. Flores, Costa Rican politician
 Rodolfo Montiel Flores, Mexican subsistence farmer
 Diego Flores (footballer) (Rodolfo Diego Flores), Argentine football manager and player